Florian Meyer may refer to:
Florian Mayer (born 1983), German tennis player.
Florian Mayer (footballer) (born 1998), German footballer

See also
Florian Maier
Florian Meyer (disambiguation)